Cheraghabad (also Romanized as Cherāghābād; also known as Chiraghābād) is a village in Sis Rural District, Bolbanabad District, Dehgolan County, Kurdistan Province, Iran. At the 2006 census, its population was 439, in 108 families. The village is populated by Kurds.

References 

Towns and villages in Dehgolan County
Kurdish settlements in Kurdistan Province